Jedhe is a Deshmukh sub clan of the Maratha caste in Maharashtra, India.

The village of Kari, in modern Bhor taluka was the capital of the Jedhe Deshmukh.

Moreover, the Jedhe were the pioneer house of Deshmukh among Marathas who supported Shivaji's kingdom and helped the Maratha Empire grow in its early stages.

Jedhe Shakawali (chronology) and Jedhe Karina (statement) are their family records which is now regarded as the genuine evidence for many historical events.

Notable people
Kanhoji Jedhe, 17th-century Marathi warrior
Keshavrao Jedhe, political leader also one of the founding member of PWPI
Sakaram Jedhe, industrialist, he also one of three brothers of Keshavrao jedhe
Gulabrao Jedhe, elected as member of parliament from Baramati, Pune by Indian National Congress

.

Mrunalini Balekundri, decorated military officer
Ayush Jedhe, entrepreneur

See also
 Maratha
 Maratha Empire
 Maratha clan system
 List of Maratha dynasties and states
 Bhonsle
 Gaekwad
 Scindia
 Puars
 Holkar
 Peshwa

References 

Surnames